Let's Eat! is a 2016 Singaporean-Malaysian comedy film directed by Chapman To in his directorial debut.  It stars To as a traditionalist chef who comes into conflict with the  restaurant owner's daughter, played by Aimee Chan.  It was released on 4 February in Malaysia and in Singapore the next day, grossing a total of US$489,846 in both territories.

Plot 
A traditionalist chef comes into conflict with the restaurant owner's daughter when she seeks to modernize the restaurant and reduce costs.

Cast 
 Chapman To as Dai Hung
 Aimee Chan as Rosemary
 Lo Hoi-pang as Ah Yong
 Patricia Mok
 C-Kwan
 Tommy Kuan
 Daphne Low

Mark Lee appears in a cameo.

Production 
To had previously worked with the producers on King of Mahjong, and they requested that he direct their next film.  Lim, one of the film's producers, said that To was impressed with the local talent after appearing in The Wedding Diary 1&2 and decided to make his next film in Singapore and Malaysia.  Production began on 8 September 2015 in Kuala Lumpur and Singapore.  To said he was inspired by local dishes, such as Hainanese chicken rice.

Release 
Let's Eat was released in Malaysia on 4 February 2016 and in Singapore the next day.  It grossed US$457,793 in Malaysia and $32,053 in Singapore; the total gross was $489,846.

Reception 
Boon Chan of The Straits Times rated it 2.5/5 stars and said that the dubbing from Cantonese to Mandarin for the Singaporean release ruined the film's humour.  Lisa Twang of The New Paper rated it 3/5 stars and compared it to The God of Cookery, which she said it does not match.  Jessica Lin of AsiaOne rated it 2/5 stars and said the film does not feature enough local Malaysian and Singaporean content.

References

External links 
 

2016 films
2016 comedy films
Malaysian comedy films
Singaporean comedy films
2010s Cantonese-language films
Films about chefs
Films shot in Kuala Lumpur
Films shot in Singapore
2016 directorial debut films